De Dion may refer to:
 Jules-Albert de Dion (1856–1946), automobile pioneer
 Henri de Dion (1828–1878), engineer
 de Dion-Bouton, automobile manufacturer
 de Dion tube, automobile suspension (vehicle)